Bisse is a surname. Notable people with the surname include:

 James Bisse ( 1552–1607), English politician
 Johannes Bisse (1935–1984), Cuban botanist
 Kevin Bisse (born 1995), Swedish footballer
 Philip Bisse (1667–1721), English bishop

See also
 Risse